Scopula atridiscata is a moth of the family Geometridae. It was described by Warren in 1897. It is found in India (the Khasi Hills).

References

Moths described in 1897
Moths of Asia
atridiscata
Taxa named by William Warren (entomologist)